Joseph Robson (21 March 1903 – 1969) was a professional footballer who played for Grimsby Town, Huddersfield Town and Bradford Park Avenue.

References

 

1903 births
English footballers
Footballers from Gateshead
Association football forwards
English Football League players
Grimsby Town F.C. players
Huddersfield Town A.F.C. players
Bradford (Park Avenue) A.F.C. players
1969 deaths